Zespri International Limited is the world's largest marketer of kiwifruit, selling in over 50 countries. Zespri was first established in 1988 under the name of the "New Zealand Marketing Board" before it formed as a co-operative of kiwifruit growers in New Zealand in 2000 and renamed itself "Zespri International Ltd." Its international headquarters are in Mount Maunganui, New Zealand. However, it has  licensed growers in Italy, France, Japan, South Korea, Greece and Australia, with trials in place in several other countries. Kiwifruit from New Zealand is available from May to October. To satisfy year-round consumer demand, Zespri markets kiwifruit from Italy from November to January.

Zespri portfolio of kiwifruit varieties includes SunGold, Green, and Organic.

Cuttings of Zespri Sungold Kiwifruit have been smuggled to China, the Kiwifruit's country of origin, where they are now competing with the legitimately-branded fruit in the China market.

Zespri's popularity has seen a recent increase in Australia, due largely in part to a marketing campaign containing two dancing and singing kiwifruit.

References

External links
Zespri
Zespri FR

New Zealand companies established in 1997
Food and drink companies of New Zealand
Food and drink companies established in 1997
Kiwifruit